Neostylopyga rhombifolia, the harlequin roach, is a species of cockroach in the family Blattidae. It is found in North America, Oceania, and Southern Asia.

References

External links

 

Cockroaches
Insects of Asia
Insects of North America
Insects of Oceania
Insects described in 1813
Taxa named by Caspar Stoll
Articles created by Qbugbot